Spyridon "Spyros" Magkounis (alternate spellings: Spiridon, Spiros, Magounis) (born December 10, 1985 in Greece) is a Greek professional basketball player. He is a 2.02 m (6 ft 7.5 in) tall small forward.

Professional career
Some of the clubs that Magkounis has played at the pro club level with include: AEK Athens, Aigaleo, Rethymno, and Elefsina.

National team career
Magkounis was a member of the junior national teams of Greece. He played at the 2001 FIBA Europe Under-16 Championship and the 2005 FIBA Europe Under-20 Championship.

References

External links
Euroleague.net Profile
FIBA Profile
FIBA Europe Profile
Eurobasket.com Profile
Greek Basket League Profile
Draftexpress.com Profile
FCM Profile
AEK Profile

1985 births
Living people
AEK B.C. players
Aigaleo B.C. players
ASK Karditsas B.C. players
Esperos B.C. players
Ethnikos Piraeus B.C. players
Faros Keratsiniou B.C. players
Greek men's basketball players
Panelefsiniakos B.C. players
Peristeri B.C. players
Rethymno B.C. players
Shooting guards
Small forwards
Basketball players from Athens